Violaine Huisman (born 1979) is a French writer. Her debut novel, The Book of Mother, won Prix Françoise Sagan and was longlisted for International Booker Prize.

Early life and education 
Violaine Huisman was born in 1979, in Paris. Her father was the French academic Denis Huisman, her mother Catherine Cremnitz. She attended Lycée Henri-IV in Paris. When she was nineteen, she moved to the United States, where she completed her studies.

Career 
Huisman has lived in New York for over two decades. She worked in publishing and translated novels. Huisman has coordinated the literary series at the Brooklyn Academy of Music, as well as managed multidisciplinary arts festivals. She works as an essayist and cultural journalist and has written for such publications as The New York Times, Vogue and The Paris Review.

Huisman's debut novel The Book of Mother was published by Éditions Gallimard in 2018 and tells the story of a Parisian woman's life, told partially through the eyes of her young daughter. The novel addresses parts of the family history of Huisman, akin to autofiction. It gained various literary awards, including Prix Françoise Sagan and the Prix Marie Claire. It was also longlisted for the International Booker Prize 2022 and was included in The New York Times 100 Notable Books list.

Works 

 Fugitive parce que reine, 2018, English ed.: The Book of Mother, Scribner, 2021, trans. by Leslie Camhi
 Rose Désert, 2019

References 

21st-century French novelists
21st-century French women writers
Writers from Paris
French women novelists
French expatriates in the United States
21st-century French essayists
Living people
1979 births
Lycée Henri-IV alumni